Sleemanabad is a village in Madhya Pradesh, India, approximately 62 km from Jabalpur and 32 km from Katni.

Etymology
Sleemanabad, literally "Sleeman's town", was named after William Henry Sleeman, a British army officer and administrator. During the colonial period Sleeman was one of the key figures responsible for bringing an end to the Thuggee Cult.

Copper deposits
Copper deposits are found in Sleemanabad. As per Geological Survey of India's DID Report (2011) on base metals, in this area the mineralisation is mostly along faults, fractures/ joints trending N10° - 20°W to S10° - 20°E. Baryte veins and limonitic patches are noticed in the brecciated quartzites. Geochemical sampling showed results for copper.

References

Villages in Katni district